ACS Sticla Arieșul Turda, commonly known as Sticla Arieșul Turda, or simply as Arieșul Turda, is a Romanian football club from Turda, Cluj County, which was established in 1907.

Chronology of names

Note: 1 year of inactivity between 2015–2016, and the team was refounded as Sticla Arieșul Turda in the Liga IV.

History

Sticla Arieșul Turda was founded in 1907 as Muncitorul Turda and has spent most of its history in the second and in the third leagues of Romania.

Their best performance was winning 1960–61 Cupa României against Rapid București, with that performance the club entered in history of Romanian football as the only club which succeeded to win the Romanian Cup without ever playing in the top league.

Honours

Leagues
Liga III
Winners (6): 1964–65, 1970–71, 1972–73, 1983–84, 1986–87, 2006–07
Runners-up (4): 1979–80, 1980–81, 1998–99, 2001–02
Liga IV – Cluj County
Winners (3): 1990–91, 1993–94, 2017–18

Cups
Cupa României
Winners (1): 1960–61
Cupa României – Cluj County
Winners (1): 2017–18

Players

First team squad

Out on loan

Club officials

Board of directors

Current technical staff

League history

References

External links
Official website

Turda
Sport in Cluj County
Football clubs in Cluj County
Association football clubs established in 1907
Liga II clubs
Liga III clubs
Liga IV clubs
1907 establishments in Romania